The National Women's Soccer League Goal of the Week was a weekly soccer award given to individual players in the National Women's Soccer League from 2016 to 2019. The honor was awarded by popular social media vote to the player deemed to have scored the best goal over the past week.

Winners

2016

2017

2018

2019

Multiple winners

The below table lists those who have won on more than one occasion.

See also 

 List of sports awards honoring women
 NWSL awards
 NWSL records and statistics
 Women's soccer in the United States

References

2016

2017

2018

2019

Player of the Week
Awards established in 2016
Goal of the Week
Lists of women's association football players
Association football player non-biographical articles